Douglas Walter Levi Summers (12 October 1911 – 1 January 2000) was an English first-class cricketer. He was a right-handed batsman and slow left arm bowler who played in a single match for Worcestershire against Warwickshire in 1930.

Summers was born in Smethwick, then Staffordshire now West Midlands; he died in Worcester on New Year's Day 2000 at the age of 88.

His father Francis had a longer Worcestershire career, making 57 appearances in the 1920s.

External links
 

English cricketers
Worcestershire cricketers
1911 births
2000 deaths
Sportspeople from Smethwick